Pártos may refer to:

Emeric Partos (1905-1975), Hungarian-born American fashion designer and furrier
Frank Partos (1901–1956), American screenwriter
Gyula Pártos, born Puntzman (1845–1916), Hungarian architect
Ödön Pártos (1907–1977), Hungarian-Israeli violist, composer
 Partoş, a village in Banloc Commune, Timiș County, Romania